In enzymology, an iron-chelate-transporting ATPase is an enzyme that catalyzes the chemical reaction

ATP + H2O + iron chelateout  ADP + phosphate + iron chelatein

The 3 substrates of this enzyme are ATP, H2O, and iron chelate, whereas its 3 products are ADP, phosphate, and iron chelate.

This enzyme belongs to the family of hydrolases, specifically those acting on acid anhydrides to catalyse transmembrane movement of substances. The systematic name of this enzyme class is ATP phosphohydrolase (iron-chelate-importing). This enzyme participates in abc transporters - general.

Structural studies

References

 
 
 
 
 

EC 3.6.3
Enzymes of known structure